Filipa Maria Salema Roseta Vaz Monteiro (9 March 1973) is a Portuguese politician and MP. Between 2019 and 2021, she was a Member of the Portuguese Parliament in the XIV session, elected by the Portuguese Social Democratic Party. She is a university Professor and an Architect.

She is the daughter of two former politicians, Pedro Roseta, a former MP and former Portuguese Minister of Culture and Helena Roseta, also a former MP, first for the Social Democratic Party, where she had prominent roles and as an Independent MP, elected for the Portuguese Socialist Party (PS).

On 25 October 2021, Roseta announced that she decided to suspend her mandate as a Member of Parliament to become a full-time Executive Council Member in Lisbon for the term 2021–2025. She was part of the political coalition "New Times" led by the former European Union Commissioner Carlos Moedas. As an Executive Council Member, she is responsible for Housing, Local Development and Municipal Works policies in Lisbon.

References

Portuguese politicians
Members of the Assembly of the Republic (Portugal)
Women members of the Assembly of the Republic (Portugal)
1973 births
Living people